Harold Aubie Bennett FRCO, FTCL, Hon.RCM (30 July 1891 - 4 February 1978) was a composer and organist based in England.

Life

He was born in Eccles, Lancashire in 1891, the son of William Arthur Bennett. He was educated at Leeds Central High School and studied organ under Sir Edward Bairstow at both Leeds Parish Church and York Minster.

He was music master at The King's School, Rochester and the conductor of Rochester Choral Society.

He married Lillian Whittick Dewhurst.

Appointments

Organist of Holy Trinity, Micklegate from 1915
Assistant organist at York Minster 1917 - 1923
Organist at St. George's Church, Doncaster 1923 - 1930
Organist at Rochester Cathedral 1930 - 1956

Compositions

He wrote a number of compositions.

References

1891 births
1978 deaths
English organists
British male organists
Fellows of the Royal College of Organists
20th-century English composers
20th-century organists
20th-century British male musicians
20th-century British musicians